Zinc finger protein 574 is a protein that in humans is encoded by the ZNF574 gene.

References

Further reading